Manuel Antonio Ortiz became President of the Provisional Junta of Paraguay on 20 September 1840 following the death of José Gaspar Rodríguez de Francia. He was chairman of the Junta until 22 January 1841, when he was overthrown in a coup. Following his deposition, Juan José Medina established a triumvirate to govern the state.

References

Presidents of Paraguay
Year of death missing
Year of birth missing
19th-century Paraguayan people